Wendell Earl Dunn Jr. (August 30, 1922 – December 24, 2007) was an American chemical engineer, metallurgist, and inventor. His technologies for high temperature chlorination, gold, tantalum and titanium extraction are still widely used.

Early years
Dunn was the first son of educator Wendell E. Dunn, for many years principal of Forest Park High School in Baltimore, and brother of conductor Thomas Dunn. A graduate of Baltimore City College and Johns Hopkins University, Dunn was also awarded a doctorate in chemical engineering from Johns Hopkins. After completing the Harvard/MIT V-12 program in 1944, he was engaged in aircraft terrain avoidance radar research in both the U.S. and occupied Germany. Dunn served as captain in the U.S. Army Air Corps until 1946.

Chemical research

In 1950 Dunn was a key member of the research and development team at E.I. DuPont de Nemours in Wilmington, Delaware which developed an improved process for the production of high-purity titanium dioxide for use as a paint pigment. He filed his first sole-inventor U.S. patent in 1954. He remained with the firm for 19 years during which time this process grew to become the dominant technology worldwide.

In 1968 Dunn left DuPont to form his own contract research and development firm in Delaware and Sydney, Australia. He worked closely for several years with a major Australian mining house, Peko-Wallsend, to develop a technology to produce a low-cost titanium process feedstock.
Thereafter, Dunn returned to South Dakota and for the next three decades made significant contributions to the field of high-temperature chlorination of metal ores.

Between 1975 and 1995 Dunn consulted to international corporations Reynolds Metals, Kerr-McGee and DuPont, among others and performed R&D which formed the bases for several start-up ventures in South Dakota and beyond. He worked with the Lien Brothers and others in the Rapid City area to develop processes for the extraction of ultra-pure niobium from ore, and tantalum metals for use in electronic applications, and for the efficient separation and recovery of gold from low-grade ore and scrap.

From the late-1980s until the late-1990s Dunn joined with European and Asian interests to develop a process for low-cost titanium-based pigments, and worked in India for months at a time. He was an adjunct faculty member in metallurgy at the South Dakota School of Mines and Technology, and was working on a patent application at the time of his death.

Dunn had a whimsical side, and in 1979 penned a political satire, The Sex Tax. Dunn is interred in Green Mount Cemetery in Baltimore. He was the nephew of civil engineer Everett Dunn.

References

Selected patents
5,004,500  Chlorination process for recovering gold values from gold alloys Filed:  February 13, 1989  
4,390,400  Aluminum chloride addition to electrolytic cells  Filed:  May 26, 1981 
4,389,391  Process for beneficiating titaniferous ores  Filed:  June 28, 1981 
4,378,337  Still heating process for purifying aluminum chloride  Filed:  June 1, 1982 
4,363,789  Alumina production via aluminum chloride oxidation  Filed: April 20, 1981
4,355,008  Chlorination process  Filed:  April 20, 1981
4,355,007  Two stage chlorination process for aluminum value containing source  Filed:  April 20, 1981
4,353,740  Chlorine extraction of gold  Filed:  September 11, 1981
4,349,516  Process for treating the gas stream from an aluminum value chlorination process  Filed:  April 20, 1981
4,331,645  Alumina from alkali metal-aluminum chloride complexes  Filed:  April 20, 1981
4,331,637  Process for purifying aluminum chloride  Filed:  April 20, 1981
4,211,755  Process for beneficiating titaniferous ores Filed:  March 3, 1975  
4,085,189  Process for recycle beneficiation of titaniferous ores  Filed:  May 21, 1976
4,081,507  Process for removing chemisorbed and interstitial chlorine and   chlorides from a hot titanium dioxide beneficiate-carbon mixtureFiled October 3, 1975
3,960,203  Fluidized bed cooler  Filed:  April 9, 1973
3,929,501  Novel titanium dioxide composition  Filed:  June 4, 1973
3,887,694  Production of chlorine  Filed:  December 22, 1972
3,865,920  Process for beneficiating a titaniferous ore and production of chlorine and iron oxide  Filed:  March 14, 1973
3,729,543  Process for preparing alkali-metal tetra-chloroferrate  Filed:  January 21, 1971
3,724,171  Annular flow condenser  Filed:  April 29, 1971
3,713,781  Cross-flow fluid bed reactor  Filed:  October 21, 1970
3,699,206  Process for beneficiation of titaniferous ores  Filed:  March 23, 1970
3,683,590  Dual flue condenser  Filed:  April 29, 1971
3,376,112  Production of chlorine through oxidation of film of ferric chloride salt complex  Filed Aug 3, 1965 
3,153,572  Process for the production of niobium pentachloride Filed Jun 1, 1961
3,107,144  Process for converting niobium oxychloride to niobium pentachloride  Filed Nov 4, 1960
3,009,773  Chlorination of niobium oxychloride Filed Mar 31, 1958
2,856,264  Charging fluidizing gas into fluidized bed reactor  Filed Apr 9, 1954

External links
Wendell E. Dunn Jr. on Google Patents 

20th-century American chemists
Johns Hopkins University alumni
Harvard University people
American chemical engineers
American metallurgists
1922 births
2007 deaths
Scientists from Baltimore
Writers from Maryland
American humorists
American political writers
American male non-fiction writers
20th-century American inventors
20th-century American male writers
Inventors from Maryland